Ranjit Dutta (born 24 January 1957) is an Indian politician from the state of Assam. He is presently a member of Assam Legislative Assembly since 2016 for the Behali constituency. He served as MLA of Behali from 2001 to 2011. He was a minister in the Sarbananda Sonowal-led government from 2016 to 2021.

Early life and education 
Dutta was born in Hatibondha, Biswanath on 24 January 1957. His father was the late Kuladhar Dutta and his mother was the late Labanya Dutta. He completed his higher Secondary from Darrang College, Tezpur in the year 1974.

Political career 
Dutta was the BJP candidate for the Behali constituency in the 2001 Assam Legislative Assembly election. He obtained 33348 votes, 50.65% of the total vote in the election. He defeated the incumbent congress MLA, Barnabash Tanti, who had been serving for the past 10 years, by 13529 votes.

In the 2006 Assam Legislative Assembly election, Dutta sought reelection in Behali. He polled 28633 votes in the election. He defeated his nearest opponent, a Congress candidate, by 8979 votes.

In the 2011 Assam Legislative Assembly election, Dutta sought reelection in Behali. He received 22662 votes, 28.02% of the total vote. He was defeated by Congress candidate and future Lok Sabha MP Pallab Lochan Das, by 18136 votes.

In the 2016 Assam Legislative Assembly election, Dutta tried to seek the Behali seat again. He again became the BJP candidate for the election. He received 52152 votes, 56.2% of the total vote. He defeated his nearest opponent, a congress candidate, by 23601 votes.

Dutta was inducted into the Sonowal cabinet as Minister for Handloom, Welfare of Minorities, Textiles & Sericulture. He was sworn in as a cabinet minister on 24 May 2016 at Guwahati.

In the 2021 Assam Legislative Assembly election, he sought reelection. He received 53583 votes, 50.93% of the total vote. He defeated his nearest opponent by 29839 votes. He was not inducted into the Sarma Ministry.

Personal life 
Dutta married Gita Dutta on 1 May 1991. They have one son and one daughter. Dutta has a special interest in social service.the names of his nephews are Ritu Raj Boruah, Kunal Raj Dutta Boruah, Rahul Raj Dutta Boruah,Anamika Boruah

References 

Living people
Bharatiya Janata Party politicians from Assam
State cabinet ministers of Assam
Assam MLAs 2016–2021
People from Sonitpur district
Assam MLAs 2021–2026
1957 births